Pakistan has one of the largest labour and manpower resources in the world, due to its large population, which is the sixth largest in the world. According to data produced by the CIA World Factbook, the total number of Pakistan's labour force is 57.2 million, making it the ninth largest country by available human workforce. About 43% of this labour is involved in agriculture, 20.3% in industry and the remaining 36.6% in other services.

The conditions under which Pakistan's blue-collar labour works have often been raised by trade unions and workers' rights organisations. There is also a controversial, yet wide use of child labour in Pakistan. Along with other countries in the South Asia, Pakistan extensively exports much of its labour to nearby Persian Gulf countries of the Middle East.

See also
 Ministry of Labour (Pakistan)
 Slavery in Pakistan
 Trade unions in Pakistan

References